George John Schneider (October 30, 1877 – March 12, 1939) was a U.S. Representative from Wisconsin.

Born in the town of Grand Chute, Wisconsin, Schneider moved to Appleton with his parents, and attended the public schools there. He learned the trade of paper making, and became active in his trade union. He served as vice-president of the International Brotherhood of Paper Makers from 1909 to 1927.
He served on the executive board of the Wisconsin State Federation of Labor from 1921 to 1928.

Public office 
Schneider was elected as a Republican to the Sixty-eighth through Seventy-second Congresses (March 4, 1923 – March 3, 1933). During this time in congress he was the representative of Wisconsin's 9th congressional district. He was an unsuccessful candidate for reelection in 1932 to the Seventy-third Congress.

After the split between the Wisconsin Republican Party and the Wisconsin Progressive Party, Schneider was elected as a member of the Progressive Party to the Seventy-fourth and Seventy-fifth Congresses (January 3, 1935 – January 3, 1939). This time he was the representative of Wisconsin's 8th congressional district. He was an unsuccessful candidate for reelection in 1938 to the Seventy-sixth Congress.

After Congress 
He resumed labor activities and died in Toledo, Ohio, on March 12, 1939, while attending a labor meeting. He was interred in Riverside Cemetery in Appleton.

Notes

External links
 

1877 births
1939 deaths
Papermakers
Wisconsin State Federation of Labor people
Wisconsin Progressives (1924)
Republican Party members of the United States House of Representatives from Wisconsin
Progressive Party (1924) members of the United States House of Representatives
20th-century American politicians
People from Grand Chute, Wisconsin